Badagi or Badgi may refer to:

 Badagi, Belgaum, a village in Belgaum District, Karnataka, India
 Badagi, Bagalkot, a panchayat village in Bilagi Taluka, Bagalkot District, Karnataka, India
 Badagi, Uttara Kannada, a village in Sirsi Taluka, Uttara Kannada District, Karnataka, India